Juris Umbraško (born 29 July 1978 in Jekabpils, Latvia) is a Latvian professional basketball player. After retiring he became a coach, and is currently working as a head coach for RSK Tarvas Rakvere ProfessionalBasketball Team

Club career

Umbraško started his senior club career with Latvijas Basketbola līga team ASK Broceni LMT and moved to European basketball powerhouse CSKA Moscow. In 2002 he came back home to represent BK Ventspils and won the Latvian Championship titles in 2002 and 2003. After unexpectedly good years abroad and in Latvia, he struggled to keep consistency in his game. He then played in Ukraine for almost 4 years, representing different teams, but achieving few success. In 2008 he returned to Latvia, but only to play episodic role in VEF Riga's Latvian League triumph. At the beginning of 2011-2012 season, the Latvian joined Estonian team BC Rakvere Tarvas with fellow Latvians Kaspars Cipruss and Rinalds Sirsniņš, the team which has been represented by many decent Latvian players: Igors Melniks, Edmunds Valeiko, Ivars Timermanis and Raimonds Vaikulis.

International career

Juris Umbraško has been a frequent member of the Latvia national basketball team. He first represented Latvia in youth level, U22 games and caught attention of the senior team staff. He was then called up to the men's squad in 2000 and played regularly until 2002, while playing in CSKA Moscow. However, his latter stints have been occasional and he has never played in any major tournament with Latvian senior team.

Honours
Latvijas Basketbola līga: 2002, 2003, 2011
EuroCup Challenge:
Runner-up: 2005-06
FIBA SuproLeague:
3rd place: 2002-03
Russian Basketball Super League:
Final Four: 2000-01
BBL Cup: 2012
BBL Challenge Cup:
Runner-up: 2011-12
Estonian Basketball Cup: 2012

External links
 Profile at basket.ee
 Profile at bbl.net
  at Doudiz.com

1979 births
Living people
BC Cherkaski Mavpy players
BC Khimik players
BK VEF Rīga players
Latvian expatriate basketball people in Estonia
Korvpalli Meistriliiga players
Latvian men's basketball players
PBC CSKA Moscow players
BC Rakvere Tarvas players
Small forwards